In enzymology, a Renilla-luciferin sulfotransferase is an enzyme that catalyzes the chemical reaction

3'-phosphoadenylyl sulfate + Renilla luciferin  adenosine 3',5'-bisphosphate + luciferyl sulfate

Thus, the two substrates of this enzyme are 3'-phosphoadenylyl sulfate and Renilla luciferin, whereas its two products are adenosine 3',5'-bisphosphate and luciferyl sulfate.

This enzyme belongs to the family of transferases, specifically the sulfotransferases, which transfer sulfur-containing groups.  The systematic name of this enzyme class is 3'-phosphoadenylyl-sulfate:Renilla luciferin sulfotransferase. Other names in common use include luciferin sulfotransferase, luciferin sulfokinase, luciferin sulfokinase (3'-phosphoadenylyl sulfate:luciferin, and sulfotransferase).

References

 

EC 2.8.2
Enzymes of unknown structure